is a yaoi manga series by Toko Kawai published by Biblos and licensed by Digital Manga Publishing.

Plot 
Surfer dude Houryu and shy intellectual Shouin are very much in love. Their days together are filled with happiness, but when Shouin's French tutor - a handsome and openly gay man named Nanami - makes his affection for Shouin known, doubts begin to surface between the couple. Houryu begins to believe Nanami's theory that Houryu is at heart a straight man and will turn to a woman when his experimentation period with Shouin is over.

References

Further reading

External links
 YaoiSuki: Our Everlasting Review
 

2000 manga
Yaoi anime and manga
Digital Manga Publishing titles